The Asansol–Gorakhpur Express is an Express train belonging to Eastern Railway zone that runs between  and  in India. It is currently being operated with 13507/13508 train numbers on a weekly basis.

Service 

Route and stops 

The important stops of the train are:

Coach composite 

The train has standard ICF rakes with a maximum speed of 110 kmph. The train consists of 16 coaches:

 1 AC III tier
 7 sleeper coaches
 6 general
 2 Seating cum luggage rake

Traction 

Both trains are hauled by an Asansol Loco Shed-based WAP-4 electric locomotive from Gorakhpur to Asansol and back.

Rake sharing 

The train shares its rake with 13509/13510 Asansol–Gonda Express.

See also 

 Gorakhpur Junction railway station
 Asansol Junction railway station
 Asansol–Gonda Express

Notes

References

External links 

 13507/Asansol–Gorakhpur Express
 13508/Gorakhpur–Asansol Express

Transport in Asansol
Express trains in India
Rail transport in West Bengal
Rail transport in Jharkhand
Rail transport in Bihar
Passenger trains originating from Gorakhpur
Railway services introduced in 2011